Battle of Neretva is a 1969 Yugoslavian epic partisan film. Written by Stevan Bulajić and Veljko Bulajić, and directed by Veljko Bulajić, it is based on the true events of World War II. The Battle of the Neretva was due to a strategic plan for a combined Axis powers attack in 1943 against the Yugoslav Partisans. The plan was also known as the Fourth Enemy Offensive and occurred in the area of the Neretva river in Bosnia and Herzegovina.

Battle of Neretva is the most expensive motion picture made in the SFR Yugoslavia. It was nominated for the Academy Award for Best Foreign Language Film, the year after Sergei Bondarchuk (playing the role of Martin in Neretva) won the honour for War and Peace. The score for the English-speaking versions was composed by Bernard Herrmann. Its soundtrack was released by Entr'acte Recording Society in 1974. It was re-released on Southern Cross Records on CD.

One of the original posters for the English version of the movie was made by Pablo Picasso, which, according to Bulajić, the famous painter agreed to do without monetary payment, only requesting a case of the best Yugoslav wines.

Synopsis
In 1943, Adolf Hitler orders the final destruction of the Yugoslav Partisans. This forces them and thousands of refugees to begin a trek northward through the Bosnian Mountains. Their goal is to reach the bridge at Neretva in order to escape. Their trip is fraught with danger every step of the way and they have to face German tanks, Italian infantry, Chetnik Cavalry, strafing airplanes, disease and natural elements.

Cast

Production

Battle of Neretva was the first of a series of huge state-sponsored World War II film productions. It had a staggering budget approved by Yugoslav leader Josip Broz Tito. Different sources put it anywhere between $4.5 million and $12 million. Global stars such as Sergei Bondarchuk, Yul Brynner, Franco Nero, Orson Welles, etc. flocked to communist Yugoslavia attracted by the huge sums of money being offered.

Shot over 16 months with funds put up in largest part by over 58 self-managed companies in Yugoslavia, the movie featured a combined battalion of 10,000 Yugoslav People's Army (JNA) soldiers. Four villages and a fortress were constructed for the film and destroyed. Several JNA-inventory Soviet T-34 tanks, touched up to look like German Panzers, met the same fate. Even used several Yugoslavian planes Soko 522 like germans luftwaffe planes with Balkenkreuz on the wings.

A railway bridge over the Neretva in Jablanica was destroyed. Director Bulajić's justification for demolishing the bridge rather than getting the shots in studio was that it would become a tourist attraction. The bridge was thus blown but because none of the footage was usable due to the billowing smoke that made it impossible to see anything, it was decided that the bridge should be repaired and destroyed again. The problem with the excessive smoke occurred again and the scenes of the bridge being blown up in the film were shot using a table-size replica at a sound stage in Prague. The Yugoslav public was updated on the shooting progress via pieces in the country's print media.

Release
The film has been edited in to numerous versions. Runtimes vary by location, the regional prints also change the story due to edits that add or remove scenes:  
 North America: 106 minutes
 Spanish:  113 minutes
 European: 127 minutes 
 UK/Australia: 127 minutes
 Germany and Croatia: 142 minutes each, although they are not the same print. 
 Serbia: 160 minutes 

Most of the actors spoke their native language and subtitled in the original release. Afterwards the film was dubbed in English and distributed world-wide with subtitles for some scenes. The English dubbed versions, running between 106 and 127 minutes, were rescored by Bernard Hermann as the original film score by Vladmir Kraus Rajteric had been damaged in the redubbing process. However, the German and Croat-language releases contain the original score.

Reception

In 1999, a poll of Croatian film fans found it to be one of the best Yugoslavian films ever made.

See also
 Force 10 from Navarone, a fictional account of part of the battle
 List of Yugoslav films
 List of most expensive non-English language films
 List of submissions to the 42nd Academy Awards for Best Foreign Language Film
 List of Yugoslav submissions for the Academy Award for Best Foreign Language Film

References

External links
 
 
 
 
 Razgovor s Veljkom Bulajićem 

1969 films
1969 war films
Yugoslav war films
Films about anti-fascism
West German films
Serbo-Croatian-language films
1960s English-language films
English-language Yugoslav films
English-language German films
English-language Italian films
World War II films based on actual events
War films set in Partisan Yugoslavia
Films set in Bosnia and Herzegovina
Partisan films
Films directed by Veljko Bulajić
Films scored by Bernard Herrmann
Films with screenplays by Ugo Pirro
War epic films
Films about bridges
Films about fascists
American World War II films
German World War II films
Italian World War II films
Yugoslav World War II films
1960s American films
1960s Italian films
1960s German films
Jadran Film films
Films about Yugoslav Resistance